Muara–Tutong Highway, (Jawi: ليبوهراي توتوڠ-موارا) is a major, inter-district highway in Brunei, and is the main road connecting the Brunei Muara and Tutong districts. It is sometimes referred to as the coastal highway due to it being mostly parallel to the coastline of Brunei.

Speed limits 
The general speed limit for the entire stretch of the highway is 100 km/h. This limit is reduced to 70 km/h during a rain. Exceptions to this are:
 The stretch from kilometre 32 to 34.7 has a speed limit of 70 km/h at all times.

Junction list 

Intersection names are conjectural and unofficial. Kilometre readings are measured from Muara town centre, 2.4 km from the start of the highway.

 I/C - interchange, I/S - intersection (at-grade), R/O - roundabout (at-grade)

Roads and Highways in Brunei